William Cook House is a set of two historic homes located near Mebane, Alamance County, North Carolina. They are a one-story one-room log house, built about 1840, and a  two-story frame I-house built about 1903.  They are set close to and at a 90-degree angle to each other.  The houses are connected by joined·hip roofed porches, carried by plain square posts.  Also on the property are the contributing two-story, single-pen log barn, a log storage shed, a frame corn crib, and a substantial log wood shed.

It was added to the National Register of Historic Places in 1993.

References

Log houses in the United States
Houses on the National Register of Historic Places in North Carolina
Houses completed in 1840
Houses in Alamance County, North Carolina
National Register of Historic Places in Alamance County, North Carolina
Log buildings and structures on the National Register of Historic Places in North Carolina